Alessandro nell'Indie is a libretto in three acts by Pietro Metastasio. It was set to music around ninety times firstly by Leonardo Vinci, whose version premiered in Rome on 2 January 1730. The libretto was the fourth of five that Metastasio wrote for the Teatro delle Dame in Rome between 1727 and 1730. The work was dedicated to the Stuart pretender to the British throne, James Francis Edward Stuart, then resident in Rome.

Alessandro nell'Indie became Metastasio's second most popular work, after Artaserse. Both were written for the Rome carnival season

Synopsis
The libretto tells the story of the Indian campaign of Alexander the Great and his defeat of king Porus in 326 BCE at the Battle of the Hydaspes. After the battle the two kings were reconciled and Alexander left Porus as ruler of his kingdom. The action takes place on the banks of the Hydaspes, where Alexander's camp stands on one side of the river and the residence of Cleofide on the other.

Roles

 Alessandro il Grande (Alexander the Great), premiered by Raffaele Signorini
 Poro (Porus), Indian king, lover of Cleofide, premiered by Giovanni Carestini
 Cleofide (Cleophis), Indian queen and lover of Porus, premiered by Giacinto Fontana, also known as "Farfallino"
 Erissena, Poros' sister, premiere by Giuseppe Appiani
 Gandarte, Porus' friend and general, who loves Erissena, premiered by Francesco Tolve
 Timagene (Coenus), Alexander's general and secret enemy, premiered by Giovanni Antonio Taffi

The following plot summary is based on the setting by Carl Heinrich Graun in his 1774 opera, Alessandro e Poro.

Act 1

The Indian camp after Porus' defeat

At the end of the overture, warlike music and the sound of guns can be heard. As the curtain opens, the Indian soldiers are seen fleeing from Alessandro's troops. The Indian King Poro tries to stop their flight, but unable to do so, he tries to kill himself. However, he is prevented by his general Gandarte, who reminds him of his beloved Cleofide. However, Poro believes that she has entered into a relationship with Alessandro. To protect his king, Gandarte offers to exchange clothes, and from then on Poro appears as Asbite and Gandarte as Poro. A little later Asbite / Poro is arrested by Timagene after a short fight. Alessandro comes in and orders no unnecessary blood to be spilled. Timagene leaves to pass the order on to the soldiers. After Asbite / Poro is introduced to Alessandro as a friend of Poro, Alessandro releases him and asks him to tell Poro that all he had to do was submit in order to secure to peace. He also gives him his own sword as a gift. Poro accepts this, but swears to Alessandro to use it against himself.

Timagene comes with the captive Erissena, Poro's sister, who was handed over to him by two Indians. Alessandro is horrified by this act. He orders the two traitors to be bound and handed over to Poro. Despite Timagene's advice, Erissena is released immediately. After Alessandro leaves, Erissena tells Timagene how impressed she is by Alessandro. Timagene, who has his eye on Erissena himself, becomes jealous.

A place surrounded by shady trees

Poro relates Alessandro's victory to Cleofide, whom he considers to be Alessandro's lover. Cleofide, however, assures him of her continued love and asks him to trust her. He swears never to be jealous again. However, when Cleofide asks Erissena, who has just arrived, whether Alessandro had spoken of her, his jealousy is immediately rekindled. Cleofide sets off for Alessandro's camp. Although Erissena advises Poro to trust Cleofide, he wants to follow her. Gandarte arrives. He has noticed that Timagene is an enemy of Alessandro and therefore still has hope for a victory. He also advises Poro against following Cleofide. Poro goes anyway. When Erissena enthuses to Gandarte about Alessandro, he points out that Poro has already promised her to him.

Large open tent with a view of Alessandro's camp and the Cleofide's residence on the other side of the Hydaspes

Cleofide crosses the Hydaspes to deliver gifts to Alessandro. He rejects them because he does not accept gifts from friends and only demands loyalty from vassals. Timagene announces the arrival of Asbites/Poro, who wants to speak to him in the presence of Cleofides. Asbite/Poro explains that Poro does not consider himself to have been defeated and rejects the proffer of peace. Cleofide tries to appease Alessandro and invites him to her residence to find out Poro's real intentions. She is sure that Asbite must have misunderstood Poro. However, Asbite assures her that he knows Poro's intentions very well and warns Alessandro about Cleofide, who once loved Poro and has now become unfaithful to him. In order to punish Poro for his renewed jealousy, Cleofide now declares her love for Alessandro. Alessandro promises her friendship, but not his heart. He leaves and Poro is reconciled with Cleofide.

Act 2

Room in Cleofide's Palace

Poro and Gandarte plan to seize the bridge over the Hydaspes, counting on the support of Timagene. When Erissena reports Alessandro's arrival, Poro thinks again of Cleofide's alleged infidelity. Gandarte advises him to forget her, and leaves. Although Erissena would like to see Alessandro again, Poro sends her away. He intends to avoid Cleofide and is anticipating victory over Alessandro.

By the bridge over the Hydaspes, with the Greek camp on the far bank

Accompanied by warlike music, Alessandro and Timagene cross the bridge with part of their army. Cleofide comes to meet them with her retinue and greets him in a friendly manner. The greeting is interrupted by the sound of guns when Poro attacks. Alessandro and Timagene hurry to the bridge.

The attack has been repelled by Alessandro. Cleofide begs the fleeing Poro not to leave her, but only when she threatens to plunge into the river and finally promises him marriage does he give in. With the enemy approaching, Poro pulls out his dagger to kill both Cleofide and himself, but Alessandro snatches it from him. To justify his action Asbite/Poro wants to reveal his true identity, but he is interrupted by the arrival of Timagene. Timagene reports that the soldiers blame Cleofide for the ambush and demand her blood. However, since Asbite/Poro assumes the blame himself, Alessandro arrests him and hands him over to Timagene. Cleofide begs Alessandro in vain to release him. Timagene sends Cleofide to his palace, and she asks him to tell Poro to remain steadfast. Timagene hands Asbite/Poro a letter assuring him that he is not to blame for the failure of the assault. Poro leaves. Timagene hopes that his intrigues against Alessandro will eventually be successful.

Room in Cleofide's Palace

Cleofide tells Gandarte that Poro intended to kill her out of love. Alessandro arrives and Gandarte hides. Alessandro tells Cleofide that he has failed to calm his soldiers' anger, and Cleofide is ready to die as a martyr. In order to save her, Alessandro offers to marry her. Since Cleofide does not want this, Gandarte, who is still dressed as Poro, comes out of hiding and offers himself as a sacrifice to save Cleofide. Alessandro is so impressed by this nobility that he hands Cleofide over to him and promises to release Asbite too. He leaves. Erissena comes and reports that Poro has thrown himself into the Hydaspes and is dead. Erissena advises the desperate Cleofide to flee.

Act 3

Covered colonnade in the palace garden

Erissena meets Poro, who is believed to be dead, but the report of his death was only spread by Timagene for his own protection after he released him. Poro is now planning to ambush Alessandro in the garden and wants Timagene to lure him there. To prove that Timagene is on his side, Poro gives Erissena his letter. After Poro leaves, first Cleofide and then Alessandro arrive. Alessandro tries to persuade Cleofide to flee. However, she now wishes to accept his marriage offer. Alessandro asks her to meet him at the temple and leaves.

Alessandro comes back with two guards and reports to Erissena that Timagene has uncovered a planned ambush. Erissena believes that Timagene has betrayed her and hands Alessandro Timagene's letter as proof of her own innocence. With Timagene's betrayal now exposed, Alessandro sends Erissena away so he can think.

Alessandro asks Timagene what he would do if he were betrayed by a friend. When Timagene replies that mercy would be out if the question in such a case, Alessandro shows him the incriminating letter. Timagene begs for mercy. Alessandro is ready to forgive him if he is faithful in the future. He leaves.

Asbite/Poro comes to talk to Timagene about the planned ambush but Timagene no longer wants to have anything to do with it. He leaves, and Gandarte and Erissena come to Poro. Erissena tells him about Cleofide's forthcoming wedding with Alessandro. Poro leaves. Erissena asks Gandarte to help Poro.

Temple of Bacchus with a burning funeral pyre

Alessandro and Cleofide enter with their retinue. A few Bacchantes are walking in front of them and the temple priest with burning torches. Poro watches the scene from a distance. When Alessandro takes Cleofide's hand, she explains that this is the hour of her death, not her wedding. According to local custom, a widow has to follow her husband in death. She wants to hurry to the burning pyre, but is held back by Alessandro. Timagene brings Gandarte, whom he still thinks to be Poro, as a prisoner. Cleofide makes another attempt to throw herself into the flames. Poro, unable to bear her suffering, steps out, reveals himself and asks her forgiveness. He is ready to accept any punishment Alessandro metes out. Alessandro, however, forgives everyone and gives Poro his kingdom back, together with his wife and freedom. In return, Poro rewards Gandarte's steadfastness with the hand of his sister Erissena, and Alessandro gives him the land beyond the Ganges as a gift. The opera ends with a chorus of praise for the fame of Alessandro.

Background
The story of Alexander the Great's encounter with Porus and the Battle of the Hydaspes has been related in many historical sources, notably in the fifth book of Arrian's Anabasis, Justin's excerpt from the twelfth book of Pompeius Trogus' Historiae Philippicae, Quintus Curtius Rufus' Histories of Alexander the Great and the chapter Alexander – Caesar from the Vitae parallelae by Plutarch.

In addition to these classical sources Metastasio also had more recent dramatic treatments to draw on. These included the 1648 play Porus ou La générosité d'Alexandre by Claude Boyer as well as Jean Racine's 1665 Alexandre le grand. Both of these versions introduced a love theme into the story just as Metastasio did. There are further similarities with  1691 L'amante eroe, set to music by Marc'Antonio Ziani and performed in Venice. David had already provided the model for Metastasio's first libretto Siface, re di Numidia.

Metastasio introduced several new elements to the story of Alexander and Porus in Alessandro nell'Indie. Firstly he introduced the jealousy motive with Porus, creating a tension between him and Cleofide not found in earlier works. He also introduced the new character of Timagene, and, with him, a revenge motive.

The libretto offers a typical example of the hierarchy of roles in an opera from around 1730. At the top is the ruler, here Alessandro. He is opposed by the first pair of lovers Cleofide and Poro. A second pair, Erissena and Gandarte, and the traitor Timagene, are subordinate to these figures. Each person embodies a different character type. The magnanimous Alessandro opposes the treacherous Timagene, and the couples also complement each other with their contrasting main features: the jealous Poro combines with the faithful Cleofide, the reliable Gandarte with the coquettish Erissena.

Adaptations
Other important settings of the libretto included those by Johann Adolph Hasse, Luigi Gatti and Giovanni Pacini. Hasse's adaptation was entitled Cleofide to reflect the prominence it gave to the role of the heroine, played by Hasse's wife Faustina Bordoni. George Frideric Handel's 1731 treatment, (Poro), was particularly admired. To suit the tastes of a London audience he cut back the recitative; the first four scenes of Act 2 were also cut to move the action along. Handel replaced various arias in Metastasio's text with new ones which he considered to have greater dramatic expression. Furthermore, as the baritone who was to play Timagene, Giovanni Commano, was not a strong singer, so Handel cut much of the material his role was to have sung.

Metastasio also created a shortened version of the libretto in 1753 for his friend Farinelli (Carlo Broschi).

Settings to music

The following composers used the libretto as the basis for an opera:

Recent performances and recordings
 Johann Christian Bach: 2000: Performed in the Schlosstheater Sanssouci in Potsdam, Akademie für Alte Musik Berlin.
 Baldassare Galuppi: 2015: Performed at the Mainfranken Theater Würzburg.
 Johann Adolph Hasse: 1986/1992: CD. Cappella Coloniensis, Rheinische Kantorei. 1994: Concert performance at the Théâtre du Châtelet Paris, the Konzerthaus Vienna and in Montreux. Les Arts Florissants, Leitung: William Christie. 2005-2009: Performed at the Semperoper, Dresden. Staatsopernchor und Staatskapelle Dresden.
 Gian Francesco de Majo: 2008: Performed at the Nationaltheater Mannheim, recorded on CD. Nationaltheater-Orchester Mannheim.
 Giovanni Pacini: 2007: CD. London Philharmonic Orchestra, Geoffrey Mitchell Choir.
 Leonardo Vinci: Arte TV broadcast of the 2022 Bayreuth production of Alessandro nel Indie

External links

 online version of the libretto (Italian) 
 plot summary of the version by Giovanni Pacini 
 plot summary of the version by Johann Adolph Hasse

Digital versions

References

Libretti by Metastasio
1730 operas
Italian-language operas
Operas
Operas based on classical mythology
Operas set in Pakistan